Cry Me a River is an album led by pianist John Hicks, with bassist Dwayne Burno and drummer Victor Lewis.

Background
"John Hicks was very much in demand during the last two decades of his life, often releasing several CDs annually for a variety of labels."

Recording and music
The album was recorded at Clinton Recording Studios, Studio A, New York City, on June 27, 1997. It was produced by Tetsuo Hara and Todd Barkan.

The trio was Hicks (piano), Dwayne Burno (bass), and Victor Lewis (drums). "Most of the session focuses on ballads, highlighted by his spacious, insightful scoring of 'Beautiful Love' and a strolling, bluesy take of the usually bittersweet 'You Don't Know What Love Is'."

Reception

The AllMusic reviewer concluded that the recording "leaves the listener wanting more from the trio".

Track listing
"Witchcraft"
"Softly, as in a Morning Sunrise"
"Beautiful Love"
"I'm Getting Sentimental Over You"
"Cry Me a River"
"Alone Together"
"You Don't Know What Love Is"
"Moon and Sand"
"'C' Jam Blues"

Personnel
John Hicks – piano
Dwayne Burno – bass
Victor Lewis – drums

References

John Hicks (jazz pianist) albums
Venus Records albums
1997 albums